Tent Nunatak is a conspicuous pyramidal nunatak marking the south limit of Whirlwind Inlet on the east coast of Graham Land. First seen and photographed from the air by the United States Antarctic Service (USAS), in 1940, and described as a "distinctive tentshaped rock nunatak." It was charted by the Falkland Islands Dependencies Survey (FIDS) in 1947.

Further reading 
 Defense Mapping Agency Hydrographic/Topographic Center, Sailing Directions (planning Guide) and (enroute) for Antarctica, P 274

External links 

 Tent Nunatak on USGS website
 Tent Nunatak on SCAR website

References 

Nunataks of Graham Land
Bowman Coast